Waterskiing at the 2015 Southeast Asian Games will be held in Bedok Reservoir, Singapore from 11 to 14 June 2015.

Participating nations
A total of 39 athletes from five nations will be competing in waterskiing at the 2015 Southeast Asian Games:

Medalists

Men

Women

Mixed

Medal table

References

External links
 

2015
2015 Southeast Asian Games events
South